Lush Life is an album by American singer Linda Ronstadt, released in November 1984 on Asylum Records as the second in a trilogy of jazz albums with bandleader/arranger Nelson Riddle. All three album covers were designed by John Kosh.

The album peaked at #13 on the Billboard 200 and #8 on the Billboard jazz chart, becoming certified as Ronstadt's record tenth platinum album.  Lush Life was nominated for two Grammys, Best Female Pop Vocal Performance and Best Album Package, winning the latter. Riddle was posthumously awarded the Grammy for Best Instrumental Arrangement Accompanying A Vocal for the title track, "Lush Life."

A music video was created for the song "Skylark," with vintage clothing by wardrobe stylist Genny Schorr.

In 1986, Asylum Records released the compilation Round Midnight, which included all tracks from all three albums with Riddle.

Track listing

Personnel 
 Linda Ronstadt – vocals
 Nelson Riddle – arrangements and conductor
 Don Grolnick – grand piano, piano solo (11)
 Bob Mann – guitar
 Bob Magnusson – bass 
 John Guerin – drums (1-6, 8, 10, 11, 12)
 David Frisina – concertmaster, violin (5)
with:
 Tommy Morgan – harmonica (2)
 Tony Terran – trumpet solo (4)
 Plas Johnson – tenor sax solo (5, 7, 8)
 Louis Bellson – drums (7, 9)
 Oscar Brashear – trumpet solo (9)
 Chauncey Welsh – trombone solo (10)

Production 
 Peter Asher – producer 
 George Massenburg – recording, mixing
 Murray Dvorkin – recording assistant, mix assistant 
 Doug Sax – mastering at The Mastering Lab (Hollywood, California).
 Gloria Boyce – album coordinator 
 John Kosh – art direction, design
 Ron Larson – art direction, design
 Robert Blakeman – photography 
 Genny Schorr – wardrobe stylist

Charts

Certifications

References

1984 albums
Linda Ronstadt albums
Albums produced by Peter Asher
Elektra Records albums
Albums arranged by Nelson Riddle
Traditional pop albums
Covers albums